Carlo Gonzaga (1525–1566) was an Italian military leader.  At the Battle of Ceresole, he commanded the Imperial heavy cavalry, and was captured by the French when it fled from the field.

References

 

1525 births
1566 deaths
Carlo
16th-century condottieri
Military leaders of the Italian Wars
16th-century Italian nobility